The 2014 United States House of Representatives elections in Maryland were held on Tuesday, November 4, 2014 to elect the eight U.S. representatives from the state of Maryland, one from each of the state's eight congressional districts. The elections coincided with other elections to the United States Senate and House of Representatives and various state and local elections, including the governor of Maryland, attorney general of Maryland and comptroller of Maryland.

Overview

By district
Results of the 2014 United States House of Representatives elections in Maryland by district:

District 1

The 1st district includes the entire Eastern Shore of Maryland as well as parts of Baltimore, Harford and Carroll counties. The incumbent is Republican Andrew P. Harris, who has represented the district since 2011. He was re-elected with 63% of the vote in 2012 and the district has a PVI of R+14.

Republican primary

Candidates

Filed
 Jonathan Goff, Jr.
 Andrew P. Harris, incumbent U.S. Representative

Primary results

Democratic primary

Candidates

Filed
 John LaFerla, OB/GYN, candidate and Democratic-endorsed write-in candidate for the seat in 2012
 Bill Tilghman, retired attorney

Withdrew
 Bridget Kelly (running for Maryland State Senate, District 35)
 Kim Letke, candidate for the seat in 2012 (running for Maryland State Senate, District 7)
 Joseph Werner (running for Harford County Executive)

Primary results

General election

District 2

The 2nd district includes parts of Howard, Harford, Baltimore and Anne Arundel Counties, as well as small portions of the City of Baltimore. The incumbent is Democrat Dutch Ruppersberger, who has represented the district since 2003. He was re-elected with 66% of the vote in 2012 and the district has a PVI of D+10. Ruppersberger considered running for Governor of Maryland in 2014 but decided against it.

Democratic primary

Candidates

Filed
 Paul Rundquist 
 Dutch Ruppersberger, incumbent U.S. Representative
 Blaine Taylor, former congressional aide and perennial candidate

Primary results

Republican primary

Candidates

Filed
 David Banach, former United States Marine

Primary results

General election

District 3

The 3rd district includes parts of Baltimore, Howard, Montgomery and Anne Arundel counties, as well as a significant part of the City of Baltimore. The incumbent is Democrat John Sarbanes, who has represented the district since 2007. He was re-elected with 67% of the vote in 2012 and the district has a PVI of D+9.

Democratic primary

Candidates

Filed
 Matthew Molyett
 John Sarbanes, incumbent U.S. Representative

Primary results

Republican primary

Candidates

Filed
 Thomas E. "Pinkston" Harris, insurance broker, nominee for the seat in 2008 and candidate for the seat in 2010 and 2012
 Michael Jackson, landscape company supervisor, candidate for the 1st district in 1992 and for the 3rd district in 2002
 Charles A. Long, retired Johns Hopkins University chemistry professor

Primary results

General election

District 4

The 4th district includes parts of Prince George's, Montgomery, and Anne Arundel counties. The incumbent is Democrat Donna Edwards, who has represented the district since 2008. She was re-elected with 77% of the vote in 2012 and the district has a PVI of D+26.

Democratic primary

Candidates

Filed
 Warren Christopher, retired United States Army Lieutenant Colonel
 Donna Edwards, incumbent U.S. Representative

Withdrew
 Dawit H. Gebreyesus

Primary results

Republican primary

Candidates

Filed
 John R. Graziani
 Greg Holmes, candidate for the seat in 2012
 Nancy Hoyt, infection preventionist
 George McDermott, Democratic candidate for the seat in 2004, 2006, 2008, 2010 and 2012

Primary results

General election

District 5

The 5th district includes all of Charles, St. Mary's, and Calvert counties, as well as portions of Prince George's and Anne Arundel counties. The incumbent is Democrat Steny Hoyer, the House Minority Whip, who has represented the district since 1981. He was re-elected with 69% of the vote in 2012 and the district has a PVI of D+14.

Democratic primary

Candidates

Filed
 Steny Hoyer, incumbent U.S. Representative

Primary results

Republican primary

Candidates

Filed
 Mark Kenneth Arness
 Chris Chaffee, candidate for the seat in 2010
 Tom Potter

Primary results

General election

District 6

The 6th district includes the entire Maryland Panhandle including all of Garrett, Allegany and Washington counties as well as portions of Montgomery and Frederick counties. The incumbent is Democrat John Delaney, who has represented the district since 2013. He was elected with 59% of the vote in 2012 against Republican incumbent Roscoe Bartlett and the district has a PVI of D+4. Delaney considered running for Governor of Maryland in 2014 but decided against it.

Democratic primary

Candidates

Filed
 John Delaney, incumbent U.S. Representative

Primary results

Republican primary

Candidates

Filed
 Dan Bongino, former United States Secret Service agent and nominee for the U.S. Senate in 2012
 Harold W. Painter, Jr., certified public accountant

Withdrew
 David E. Vogt III, former United States Marine

Primary results

General election

District 7

The 7th district includes just over half of the City of Baltimore, most of the majority African American sections of Baltimore County, and the majority of Howard County, Maryland. The incumbent is Democrat Elijah Cummings, who has represented the district since 1996. He was re-elected with 77% of the vote in 2012 and the district has a PVI of D+24.

Democratic primary

Candidates

Filed
 Alexander Bryant
 Elijah Cummings, incumbent U.S. Representative
 Fred Donald Dickson, Jr., Independent candidate for the seat in 2010

Primary results

Republican primary

Candidates

Filed
 Ray Bly, perennial candidate
 Corrogan R. Vaughn, perennial candidate

Primary results

General election

District 8

The 8th district includes parts of Carroll, Frederick and Montgomery counties. The incumbent is Democrat Chris Van Hollen, who has represented the district since 2003. He was re-elected with 63% of the vote in 2012 and the district has a PVI of D+11.

Democratic primary

Candidates

Filed
 George English, perennial candidate
 Chris Van Hollen, incumbent U.S. Representative
 Lih Young, economist and perennial candidate

Primary results

Republican primary

Candidates

Filed
 Dave Wallace, candidate for the State House of Delegates in 2006 and 2010 and for the seat in 2012

Primary results

General election

See also
 2014 United States House of Representatives elections
 2014 United States elections

References

External links
U.S. House elections in Maryland, 2014 at Ballotpedia
Campaign contributions at OpenSecrets

Maryland
2014
United States House of Representatives